Craig Makin (born ) is a former professional rugby league footballer who played in the 1990s and 2000s.

International honours
Craig Makin won caps for Wales while at Salford 1999 2-caps.

References

External links
Home bows for Leeds trio
Wakefield suffer Mason KO
Harris named in Wales squad

1973 births
Living people
Place of birth missing (living people)
Rugby league props
Salford Red Devils players
Wales national rugby league team players
Widnes Vikings players